Raghu was a ruler of the Indian Ikshvaku dynasty. Raghu may also refer to
Raghu (name)
Raghu Engineering College in Andhra Pradesh, India
Raghu Romeo, a 2003 Bollywood film 
Rama Rama Raghu Rama, a 2011 Kannada language film 
 Raghuvamsha Sudha, a popular kriti in Carnatic music